Ranoidea bella is a species of frog in the subfamily Pelodryadinae, first found in Cape York Peninsula. The species is most similar to R. gracilenta and R. chloris, but can be distinguished from its cogeners by having a large male body size (between ), a "near-immaculate" green dorsum, an orange venter, its bright orange-coloured digits and webbing, the purple lateral surfaces of its thighs, by lacking a canthal stripe, its white bones, and a single-note male advertisement call. It inhabits rainforest and monsoon vine thicket near water.

References

bella
Frogs of Australia
Amphibians of Queensland
Endemic fauna of Australia
Amphibians described in 2016
Taxa named by Jodi Rowley
Taxa named by Stephen J. Richards